Chlorodesmis fastigiata is a species of algae belonging to the family Udoteaceae.

The species is found in Indian and Pacific Ocean.

References

Udoteaceae